Kaliganj is an upazila of Jhenaidah District in the Division of Khulna, Bangladesh. One of the most important commercial area is Kaliganj under Khulna Division. It crosses between Dhaka Khulna Highway.
It has the myth of Gazi Kalu Champabati, Historical mosques of Barobazar, the largest banyan tree in Asia & the flow of Chitra & Begobati. It is bounded by Jhenaidah sadar on the north,Jessore district on the south, Kotchandpur Upazilla in west and Magura district at east.

Geography
It has 38,339 households and a total area of 310.16 km2. Main rivers are Chittra, Bhairab,Begabati.

Demographics
According to the 2011 Bangladesh census, Kaliganj had a population of 282,366. Males constituted 50.04% of the population and females 49.96%. Muslims formed 82.74% of the population, Hindus 16.00%, Christians 1.23% and others 0.03%. Kaliganj had a literacy rate of 51.97% for the population 7 years and above.

As of the 1991 Bangladesh census, Kaliganj had a population of 219,126. Males constituted 51.76% of the population, and females 48.24%. The population aged 18 or older was 112,587. Kaliganj has an average literacy rate of 29.7% (7+ years), compared to the national average of 32.4%.

Economy

Mobarakganj Sugar Mills Ltd
Agriculture
Hand-loom
Cold storage
Machineries
Business

Points of interest
 Naldanga Temple Complex:, in the Kaliganj Upazila, is a temple complex built in 1656 by Maharaj Indranarayan Debroy. There are a total of six temples now. The government restored all of them in 1980s but they were destroyed again during the riot and now most of them are in ruins. Renovations are still going on. The idol of goddess Kali was from Banaras, India.
 The biggest banyan tree in the world is situated at Mollikpur Village under Kaligonj Upazila.
 Baro Bazar: Gazi kalur chompa botir Mazar, Gora Mosjid, Sako bazar mosjid and more than 10 other mosques and more than 5 large dighi (reservoirs) are situated in Baro Bazar of Kaligonj.
 Bulu Deouan er Mazar is another remarkable place in Kaligonj Upazila.
 Kolika Doha is situated in Naldanga, 300 miter distance from Naldanga Temple Complex.
 The Gunjanath temple dates back to the 17th century, also in Kaliganj. It can be reached from Naldanga.
 Alaipur Mosque : A historical mosque has been discovered here in the previous decade.
 Baro bazar fish Market is one of biggest fish market in khulna division
 Sheikh russel mini stadium
 Mobarakganj Sugar Mills Ltd
 Mobarakganj railway station

Administration
Kaliganj Upazila is divided into Kaliganj Municipality and 11 union parishads: Bara Bazar, Jamal, Kashtabhanga, Kola, Maliat, Niamatpur, Roygram, Rakhalgachhi, Shimla Rokonpur, Sundarpur Durgapur, and Trilochanpur. The union parishads are subdivided into 188 mauzas and 198 villages.

Kaliganj Municipality is subdivided into 9 wards and 20 mahallas.

Kaliganj Upazila is encompassed by parliamentary constituency Jhenaidah-4.

Member of Parliament : 
 Mr. Anoarul Azim Anar, MP (5 January 2014 – present) in 10th General Election
 Mr. Abdul Mannan, MP (2009–2014) in 9th General Election
 Mr. Shahidul Islam Baltu, MP (1991–1996, February 1996 – June 1996, 1996–2001, 2001–2006) in 5th to 8th General Election

Education
 Govt. Naldanga Bhushan Pilot Secondary School, (Kaliganj) was formed in 1882 by Rajadhiraj Pramatha   Bhushan Roy Choudhury. It is one of the oldest and notable institutions of Bangladesh.   
G.K United high school.
Pakh Sharif dakil Madrasa.
Kastovanga girls high school.
Gourinathpur govt.primary school.  
 Baliadanga M.S Secondary School is one of the oldest high school of Kaliganj.
 Kolabazar Secondary High School,(Kolabazar,Kaliganj)
 Shaheed Noor Ali College
 Sait Baria Haqqul Huda Alim Madrasha
 Mahatab Uddin Degree College, Kaliganj
 Ramnagor College
Rostom Ali High School, Roghunathpur.
 Solimunnesa Girls' High School, Kaliganj
 Chaprail High School, Kaliganj, Jhenaidah was formed in 1963.
 Mobarakganj High School, Kaliganj, Jhenaidah
 Hat baro bazar high School,Barobazar
 BAROBAZAR COLLEGE,BAROBAZAR
 Hat Baro Bazar Girls school,Barobazar
 Gazir Hat High School (Gazir Hat, Kaliganj)
 Hasanhati Baro Dhopadi Ebadat Ali High School.
 Hasanhati Govt. Primary School.
 Gopalpur secondary high school,Gopalur
 Panchkahuni secondary High school, kaliganj
 Mongolpaita parkhidha collage, kaliganj
 Bejpara High School, Kaliganj
 Arpara sibnagar model government primary school, kaliganj
 Bhatghara-Doyapur government primary school, Bhatghara-Doyapur, kaliganj
 Naldanga Bushan shishu academy, kaliganj
 Al-amin precadet school, kaliganj
 Ashar Alo precadet school, kaliganj
 Shaheen precadet school, kaliganj
 Keyabagan hosnin adorsho college, kaliganj
 Bhatghara high school, bhatghara, kaliganj
 Shoiaibnagar fazil madrashah, kaliganj
 Alhaz Amzad Ali Faizur Rahman Mohilla College, Kaliganj
 Kastovanga Government Primary School

Notable people
Qazi Mu'tasim Billah, Islamic scholar and professor

References

Upazilas of Jhenaidah District
Jhenaidah District
Khulna Division